United Nations Security Council Resolution 109, adopted on December 14, 1955, after being instructed by the General Assembly to consider the applications for membership of Albania, Austria, Bulgaria, Cambodia, Ceylon, Finland, Hungary, Ireland, Italy, Jordan, Laos, Libya, Nepal, Portugal, Romania, and Spain. The Council recommended all of the above-named countries for admission to the United Nations.

The resolution was adopted by eight votes; Belgium, China and the United States abstained.

See also
List of United Nations Security Council Resolutions 101 to 200 (1953–1965)

References
Text of the Resolution at undocs.org

External links
 

 0109
1955 in the Republic of Ireland
1955 in Portugal
1955 in Italy
1955 in Austria
1955 in Spain
1955 in Bulgaria
1955 in Cambodia
People's Republic of Bulgaria
Socialist Republic of Romania
Hungarian People's Republic
 0109
 0109
 0109
 0109
 0109
 0109
 0109
 0109
 0109
 0109
 0109
 0109
 0109
 0109
 0109
1955 in Libya
 0109
 0109
1955 in Ceylon
1955 in Romania
1955 in Albania
1955 in Laos
1955 in Hungary
1955 in Jordan
1955 in Finland
1955 in Nepal
December 1955 events
Foreign relations of Spain during the Francoist dictatorship